Unheimliche Geschichten may refer to:

 Unheimliche Geschichten (1919 film), a silent film starring Conrad Veidt
 Unheimliche Geschichten (1932 film), a talkie film starring Paul Wegener